WFBM-LP (100,1 FM) was an American low-power FM radio station licensed to serve the community of Beaver Springs, Pennsylvania. The station's broadcast license was held by Beaver Springs Faith Baptist Church, Inc.

WFBM-LP broadcast a Southern Gospel music format to Snyder County, Pennsylvania, from September 2004 until January 2012.

History
In June 2001, Beaver Springs Faith Baptist Church applied to the U.S. Federal Communications Commission (FCC) for a construction permit for a new low-power FM radio station. The FCC granted this permit on May 12, 2003, with a scheduled expiration date of November 12, 2004. The new station was assigned call sign "WFBM-LP" on May 20, 2003. After construction and testing were completed in September 2004, the station was granted its broadcast license on May 12, 2005.

Beaver Springs Faith Baptist Church, Inc., received a license for full-power WFBM (90.1 FM) so, per FCC regulations, surrendered its low-power broadcast license. The station's license was cancelled on January 23, 2012, and the WFBM-LP call sign was deleted from the FCC database.

References

External links
 

Defunct religious radio stations in the United States
FBM-LP
FBM-LP
Radio stations established in 2004
Radio stations disestablished in 2012
Snyder County, Pennsylvania
Defunct radio stations in the United States
2004 establishments in Pennsylvania
2012 disestablishments in Pennsylvania
FBM-LP